The Chief Shakes Historic Site is a historic collection of original and recreated Native Alaskan artifacts.  It is located on Shakes Island, inside Wrangell Harbor, Wrangell City and Borough, Alaska.  The most prominent feature of the site is a 1940 reconstruction of a Tlingit community house.  This structure incorporates six original house posts, carved poles similar to totem poles.  The house posts, four of which are from the community house of Chief Shakes, a line of like-named Tlingit clan leaders, are reported to be among the oldest known to survive.  The house is surrounded by seven totem poles, two of which are original Tlingit work, and five of which are copies created by crews of the Civilian Conservation Corps that also built the house.

The site was listed on the National Register of Historic Places in 1970.

See also
National Register of Historic Places listings in Wrangell, Alaska

References

External links 
Chief Shakes Historic Site at The Living New Deal Project

1940 establishments in Alaska
Buildings and structures completed in 1940
Civilian Conservation Corps in Alaska
National Register of Historic Places in Wrangell, Alaska
Native American history of Alaska
Tourist attractions in Wrangell, Alaska
Tlingit culture